AT Sports Club is a Maldivian professional football club based in Malé.  VB Addu FC is the former VB Sports club, which was re-branded on 14 January 2012.

History
The club was founded in 2008. The club originally evolved from Sifain Football Club, a team which was formed by the staffs of Bandos Island Resort. Orchid was later bought by the owners of Club Lagoons and renamed as New Lagoons which later was undertaken by a group of businessmen from Addu Atoll and was changed to the name of ‘Island Football Club’. The team was changed to ATsports on 8 November 2008.

Performance in AFC competitions
AFC Cup: 5 appearances
2004: Group Stage
2009: Group Stage
2010: Group Stage
2011: Group Stage
2012: Group Stage

Honors

Dhivehi League: 3
2009, 2010, 2011

Maldives FA Cup: 4
2002, 2003, 2008, 2011

Charity Shield: 3
2010, 2011, 2012

Male' League: 1
2002

President's Cup: 1
2010

References

External links
Club Official Website
Football Association of Maldives

Football clubs in the Maldives
Football clubs in Malé
Association football clubs established in 1987
1987 establishments in the Maldives